Yorkshire and the Humber was a constituency of the European Parliament. It elected six Members of the European Parliament (MEPs) using the D'Hondt method of party-list proportional representation, until the UK exit from the European Union on 31 January 2020.

Boundaries 
The constituency corresponded to the Yorkshire and the Humber region of the United Kingdom, comprising the ceremonial counties of South Yorkshire, West Yorkshire, East Riding of Yorkshire and parts of North Yorkshire and Lincolnshire.

History 
It was formed as a result of the European Parliamentary Elections Act 1999, replacing a number of single-member constituencies. These were Humberside, Leeds, North Yorkshire, Sheffield, Yorkshire South, Yorkshire South West, Yorkshire West, and parts of Cleveland and Richmond and Lincolnshire and Humberside South.

Returned members 

1Diana Wallis resigned in January 2012.
2Timothy Kirkhope was appointed to the House of Lords in 2016 and as a result was required to resign.

Election results 

Elected candidates are shown in bold. Brackets indicate the order in which candidates were elected, and the number of votes per seat won in their respective columns.

References

External links
Biographies of Y&H candidates 2009 at Micandidate
Breakdown of 2009 election results by council areas (pdf)
 Includes photos, contact information, links to EU website profiles

European Parliament constituencies in England (1999–2020)
Politics of Lincolnshire
Politics of Yorkshire
Yorkshire and the Humber
1999 establishments in England
Constituencies established in 1999
Constituencies disestablished in 2020